The Men's 50 metre freestyle S10 event at the 2016 Paralympic Games took place on 9 September 2016, at the Olympic Aquatics Stadium. No heats were held. The swimmers with the eight fastest times advanced to the final.

Heats

Heat 1 
10:06 9 September 2016:

Heat 2 
10:09 9 September 2016:

Heat 3 
10:12 9 September 2016:

Swim-off 
11:39 9 September 2016:

Final 
18:45 9 September 2016:

Notes

Swimming at the 2016 Summer Paralympics